Abraham Lincoln High School is a public high school located in Council Bluffs, Iowa, United States.  It is one of two high schools in the Council Bluffs Community School District.

Demographics 
The demographic breakdown of the 1,334 students enrolled for the school year 2017–2018 was as follows:

By gender 
 Male – 50.9%
 Female – 49.1%

By race 

 White – 80.9%
 Hispanic – 11.3%
 Multiracial – 3.6%
 African American – 1.4%
 Native American/Alaskan – 1.2%
 Asian/Pacific Islander – 1.1%

Athletics 
The Lynx compete in the Missouri River Conference in the following sports:

Baseball 
Basketball 
Bowling
Cross Country
 Boys' 1948 State Champions 
Football
Golf 
Soccer 
Softball 
Swimming 
Tennis 
Track and Field 
Volleyball 
Wrestling

Notable alumni
 Stan Bahnsen, former professional baseball player (New York Yankees, Chicago White Sox, Oakland Athletics, Montreal Expos, California Angels, Philadelphia Phillies)
 Philip N. Krasne, producer of the later Charlie Chan films and The Cisco Kid television series 
 Jon Lieber, former professional baseball player (Pittsburgh Pirates, Chicago Cubs, New York Yankees, Philadelphia Phillies)
Dan Dawson, current member of the Iowa Senate

See also
List of high schools in Iowa

References

External links
 Council Bluffs Community School District

Public high schools in Iowa
Buildings and structures in Council Bluffs, Iowa
Schools in Pottawattamie County, Iowa